The 2019 MAC Championship Game was a college football game played on Saturday, December 7, 2019, at Ford Field in Detroit, Michigan, to determine the 2019 champion of the Mid-American Conference (MAC). With sponsorship from Marathon Petroleum, the game was officially the 2019 Marathon MAC Football Championship Game. The game featured the East division champions Miami (of Ohio) and the West division champions Central Michigan, and was the conference's 23rd championship game. The game was won by Miami, 26–21.

Previous season
The 2018 MAC Championship Game featured East Division champion Buffalo against West Division champion Northern Illinois. The Huskies upset the Bulls in a 30–29, to win their fourth title.

Teams
The 2019 MAC Championship Game will be contested by the Miami RedHawks, East Division champions, and the Central Michigan Chippewas of West division. Miami leads the all-time series 14–13–1; the teams last met in 2017, when Miami won 31–14.

Miami
Miami clinched its spot in the Championship Game after Buffalo lost to Kent State on November 14. A day after Miami defeated Bowling Green, to gain their seventh win their conference. This is Miami's fifth overall appearance in the Championship Game, their first since 2010. The RedHawks compile a 2–2 record in the game, winning in 2003 and in 2010.

Central Michigan
The Chippewas entered the game 8-4 and 6-2 in the MAC.  Their four losses came to Wisconsin, Miami (FL), Western Michigan and Buffalo.  They clinched the division in the last week of the season, with a win over Toledo.  The Chippewas are 3-0 in MAC Championship games, with their most recent win coming in 2009.

Game summary

Statistics

See also
 List of Mid-American Conference football champions

References

External links
 Central Michigan game notes
 Miami game note

Championship
MAC Championship Game
Central Michigan Chippewas football games
Miami RedHawks football games
American football competitions in Detroit
December 2019 sports events in the United States
MAC Championship
MAC Championship